Horní Studénky is a municipality and village in Šumperk District in the Olomouc Region of the Czech Republic. It has about 300 inhabitants.

Etymology
The name is probably derived from Czech word studánky (i.e. "springs") and refers to a large number of springs flowing from the slopes around the village. There is also a theory that the name is derived from studený, i.e. "cold".

History
The first written mention of Horní Studénky is from 1353.

Sights
The landmark of Horní Studénky is the Church of Saint Linhart. The original church was built shortly after the village was founded. The current building dates from 1666.

References

Villages in Šumperk District